A Covenant with Death is a 1967 American legal drama film directed by Lamont Johnson (in his feature directorial debut), from a screenplay by Lawrence B. Marcus and Saul Levitt, based on the 1964 novel of the same name by Stephen Becker. The film stars George Maharis, Laura Devon, Katy Jurado, and Earl Holliman.

Plot
Within a small Southwestern town on the Mexican border in 1923 America, a promiscuous married woman is found dead in her bedroom. Her grieving, jealous and widely disliked husband, Bryan Talbot (Earl Holliman), is convicted of her murder and sentenced to hang on purely circumstantial evidence. The presiding Judge Hochstadter (Arthur O'Connell) departs for a fishing trip, leaving it up to the inexperienced, 29 year old Mexican-American judge (and lothario) Ben Morealis Lewis (George Maharis), to oversee the execution. Problem is, Lewis has his own misgivings about mandatory sentencing and capital punishment in general, and about Talbot's guilt in particular.

In a stunning turn of events, Talbot unintentionally kills his executioner while trying to avoid being hanged for a murder he fiercely denies having committed. While awaiting the arrival of a replacement hangman, another man confesses to killing Talbot's Wife. Judge Lewis must negotiate various relationships (with his mother, and two very different women for whom he harbors strong and conflicting feelings), in addition to provincial attitudes about love and marriage, sexuality, modernity, maturity, cultural integrity, group loyalty and his faith in the triumph of justice.

Cast
 George Maharis as Benjamin "Ben" Lewis
 Laura Devon as Rosemary
 Katy Jurado as Eulalia Lewis
 Earl Holliman as Bryan Talbot
 Sidney Blackmer as Sebastian Oates
 Gene Hackman as Alfred Harmsworth
 John Anderson as Dietrich
 Wende Wagner as Rafaela Montemayor
 Emilio Fernández as Ignacio Montemayor
 Kent Smith as Oliver Parmelee
 Lonny Chapman as Edgar Musgrave
 Arthur O'Connell as Judge Hockstadter
 Jose De Vega as John Digby
 Larry D. Mann as George Chillingworth
 Whit Bissell as Bruce Donnelly
 Russell Thorson as Doctor Shilling
 Erwin Neal as Willie Wayte
 Jadeen Vaughn as Louise Talbot
 Paul Birch as Governor
 Robert Dunlap as Tolliver
 Kelton Garwood as Mr. Moody

References

External links
 

1967 films
1967 directorial debut films
1967 drama films
American legal drama films
Films about miscarriage of justice
Films about murder
Films based on American novels
Films directed by Lamont Johnson
Films scored by Leonard Rosenman
Films set in 1923
Films set in New Mexico
Films shot in New Mexico
Murder mystery films
Warner Bros. films
1960s American films